Ogden House is a historic home located at Swarthmore, Delaware County, Pennsylvania. It was built in 1736, and is a three-story stone house faced on three sides with dressed stone and one side with rubble stone. One of the dressed stone sides is coated with stucco.  It has a double pitched roof and two massive stone chimneys.

It was added to the National Register of Historic Places in 1979.

References

Houses on the National Register of Historic Places in Pennsylvania
Houses completed in 1736
Houses in Delaware County, Pennsylvania
National Register of Historic Places in Delaware County, Pennsylvania
Swarthmore, Pennsylvania